Lamaing may refer to several places in Burma (Myanmar):

 Lamaing, Kale
 Lamaing, Madaya 
 Lamaing, Singu
 Lamaing, Ye